"Voice of the Heroes" is a song by American rappers Lil Baby and Lil Durk, released on May 31, 2021 as the lead single and from their collaborative studio album of the same name (2021), with an accompanying music video. It was produced by Touch of Trent and Haze.

Composition
In the song, Lil Baby and Lil Durk talk about their journeys to success and celebrating it, as well as their "inevitable responsibility as 'heroes' to the friends and family they rose with." Durk reflects his life in the past year, such as missing family time and payment bonds. Baby sings about his dominance in the rap industry and hints at a "downtick of guest features on his part". The chorus explains that Lil Durk is the titular "voice" and Lil Baby is the "hero". They also mention their time in prison.

Music video
The music video was directed by Daps and filmed in Lil Baby's hometown of Oakland City, Atlanta. In it, the rappers toss money off a roof and connect with different generations in the city. Lil Durk also raps in front of a police car.

Charts

Certifications

References

2021 singles
2021 songs
Lil Baby songs
Lil Durk songs
Motown singles
Songs written by Lil Baby
Songs written by Lil Durk